1,6-Dioxecane-2,7-dione is a chemical compound classified as a lactone.  It is formed as an impurity in the manufacture of polymer resins and biodegradable polyesters. It is the cyclic dimer of GHB and has been sold as a designer drug.

See also
 Aceburic acid
 Ethyl acetoxy butanoate
 gamma-Butyrolactone
 gamma-Hydroxybutyraldehyde

References

Lactones